Tom Carter may refer to:

 Tom Carter (diplomat), British politician
Tom Carter (golfer) (born 1968), American golfer
 Tom Carter (American football) (born 1972), American football player
 Tom Carter (wrestler) (born 1974), American professional wrestler known by stage name Reckless Youth
 Tom Carter (rugby union) (born 1983), centre for the New South Wales Waratahs

See also
 Thomas Carter (disambiguation)